The women's 61 kg competition in judo at the 1992 Summer Olympics in Barcelona was held on 30 July at the Palau Blaugrana. The gold medal was won by Cathérine Fleury of France.

Results

Main brackets

Pool A

Pool B

Repechages

Repechage A

Repechage B

Final

Final classification

References

External links
 

W61
Judo at the Summer Olympics Women's Half Middleweight
Olympics W61
Judo